God mode may refer to:
 God mode, a general purpose term for a cheat code in video games that makes a player invincible
 God Mode (video game), a 2013 video game released for Windows PCs and consoles
 "God Mode" (Person of Interest), an episode of Person of Interest
 "God Mode" (song) by the rapper 360
 Windows Master Control Panel shortcut, sometimes referred to as Windows God Mode

See also